Honk may refer to:

 Honk (band)
 Honk (magazine)
 Honk!, a musical adaptation of the Hans Christian Andersen story The Ugly Duckling
 HONK!, the Festival of Activist Street Bands in Somerville, Massachusetts
 Honk, the Moose, a children's book by Phil Stong
 Honk (website), a social automotive website
 Honk (album), a 2019 compilation album by the Rolling Stones
 Making sound using a vehicle horn
 Vocalization associated with geese

HONK may refer to:

 Hyperosmolar hyperglycemic state, also known as hyperosmotic non-ketotic coma, a type of diabetic coma

See also 
 Honka (disambiguation)
 Honker (disambiguation)
 Honky (disambiguation)